Yevgeni Vladimirovich Knyazhev (born 21 January 1968) is a Russian football coach and a former player. He is an assistant coach with FC Torpedo Moscow.

Club career
He played one game for the main squad of FC Torpedo Moscow in the USSR Federation Cup.

References

1968 births
People from Novorossiysk
Living people
Soviet footballers
FC Chernomorets Novorossiysk players
FC Kuban Krasnodar players
FC SKA Rostov-on-Don players
FC Torpedo Moscow players
Russian footballers
FC Zhemchuzhina Sochi players
Russian Premier League players
FC Tyumen players
Association football midfielders
Sportspeople from Krasnodar Krai